European Korfball B-Championship is a second level korfball competition for European national teams organized by the International Korfball Federation and is placed below the European Korfball A-Championship.

History
The tournament features the nations that have not qualified for the European Korfball A-Championship and a promotion/relegation system will be put into place between both championships, with the winner of the B-Championships promoting to the A-Championships, although the exact manner is yet to be defined. The tournament can be seen as the successor of the defunct Korfball European Bowl, although that tournament served as a qualifier for both European Korfball Championship and the Korfball World Championship. The B-Championships are held every two years, always in the same year as the A-Championship. The first edition was hosted by the Netherlands in 2018.

Results

Debut of teams

Medals summary

See also
International Korfball Federation
European Korfball A-Championship
Korfball European Bowl

External links
International Korfball Federation

Korfball competitions
Korfball in Europe
European championships